Men's race at the 2021 UCI Mountain Bike Marathon World Championships took place in Elba on 2 October 2021.

Course 
The 2021 XCM World Championship was held over a 35km course with 3 laps plus an initial 2km lap and a final 8km lap. In total, the men's race was 115 km with a difference in altitude of 4,500 metres.

Result 
114 competitors from 26 nations started.

75 competitors reached the finish line.

References 

2021 UCI Mountain Bike Marathon World Championships